This article provides a list of foreshocks and aftershocks of  4.0 or greater of the 2023 Turkey–Syria earthquake. The area has experienced more than 480 such aftershocks.

Key

Foreshocks

Mainshock

Aftershocks

February

March

References

foreshocks
Earthquakes in Syria
Earthquakes in the Levant
Earthquakes in Turkey
Lists of earthquakes